Carlos Casartelli (born 4 November 1974, in Villa Ángela) is an Argentine former professional footballer.

Casartelli made his professional debut for Deportivo Mandiyú in 1994. He played for a number of clubs in Mexico between 2000 and 2008 before returning to Argentina to play for Club Atlético Huracán, he was released in 2008.

His brother Fernando Casartelli is also a footballer.

External links
 
 
Tecos profile 

1974 births
Living people
People from Villa Ángela
Argentine footballers
Argentine expatriate footballers
Argentine expatriate sportspeople in Spain
Textil Mandiyú footballers
Club Atlético Independiente footballers
Estudiantes de La Plata footballers
Gimnasia y Esgrima de Jujuy footballers
Club Atlético Huracán footballers
UD Salamanca players
RCD Espanyol footballers
Atlante F.C. footballers
C.D. Veracruz footballers
Querétaro F.C. footballers
C.F. Monterrey players
Correcaminos UAT footballers
Tecos F.C. footballers
Dorados de Sinaloa footballers
Indios de Ciudad Juárez footballers
Club León footballers
La Liga players
Liga MX players
Association football forwards
Sportspeople from Chaco Province